Persoonia, commonly known as geebungs or snottygobbles, is a genus of about one hundred species of flowering plants in the family Proteaceae. Plants in the genus Persoonia are shrubs or small trees usually with smooth bark, simple leaves and usually yellow flowers arranged along a raceme, each flower with a leaf or scale leaf at the base. The fruit is a drupe.

Description
Persoonias are usually shrubs, sometimes small trees and usually have smooth bark. The adult leaves are simple, usually arranged alternately but sometimes in opposite pairs, or in whorls of three or four. If a petiole is present, it is short. The flowers are arranged singly or in racemes, usually of a few flowers, either in leaf axils or on the ends of the branches. Sometimes the raceme continues to grow into a leafy shoot. The tepals are free from each other except near their base, have their tips rolled back and are usually yellow. There is a single stigma on top of the ovary and surrounded by four stamens. The fruit is a drupe containing one or two seeds.

Taxonomy and naming
The genus Persoonia was first formally described in 1798 by James Edward Smith and the description was published in Transactions of the Linnean Society of London. The generic name is in honour of Dutch mycologist and botanist Christiaan Hendrik Persoon. Smith did not nominate a type species but in 1988, Persoonia lanceolata was nominated as the lectotype.

The term geebung is derived from the Dharug language word geebung, while the Wiradjuri term was jibbong. The etymology of "snottygobble" is more obscure. The English Dialect Dictionary published in 1904 lists snotergob, snot-gob and snotty-gobble as "the fruit of the yew-tree, Taxus baccata" noting that "children devour quantities of the red part of these berries, which they call snotty-gobbles, and suffer no ill-effects". The pulp around the hard stone in the drupes of Persoonia is edible although "the operation is a little like nibbling sweet cotton wool".

Molecular hylogenetic studies indicate that Toronia, Garnieria and Acidonia all lie within the large genus Persoonia.

Distribution and habitat
All species are endemic to Australia, though a closely related species, Toronia toru is found in New Zealand and has been described as a species within the genus Persoonia previously. They are widespread in non-arid regions. One species, P. pertinax, is found only in the Great Victoria Desert, while a few other species venture into the arid zone, but most are concentrated in the subtropical to temperate parts of south eastern and south western Australia, including Tasmania.

Most species are plants of well-drained, acid, sandy or sandstone-based soils that are low in nutrients, although one, Persoonia graminea, grows in swampy habitats. Three species (P. acicularis, P. bowgada and P. hexagona) tolerate mildly calcareous soils, and several south eastern species sometimes grow on basalt-derived soils, and but these are unusual. The greatest diversity of species is found in areas with soils derived from sandstones and granites.

Ecology

Interactions between micro-organisms and Persoonia species are poorly known, and no mycorrhizal associations have been reported for any species of Persoonioideae. Several species of Persoonia (P. elliptica, P. gunnii, P. longifolia, P. micranthera, P. muelleri) are known to be highly susceptible to infection by an Oomycete, Phytophthora cinnamomi, in the wild and this pathogen is strongly suspected of being responsible for the deaths of many other species in cultivation.

The sclerophyllous plant communities where Persoonia species usually live are fire-prone environments, hence Persoonia species have adapted to frequent bushfires. The most obvious adaptations are features that allow plants to survive fires, albeit in a more-or-less pruned state. Many species, especially in the south west, are lignotuberous, resprouting from ground level after fire. Several also develop thick bark that protects epicormic buds, which resprout from trunks and large branches after fire. The most eye-catching of these are the four “paper-barked” species: P. falcata, P. levis, P. linearis and P. longifolia. Branch resprouters with less conspicuous protective bark include P. amaliae, P. elliptica, P. katerae and P. stradbrokensis. Fire-sensitive species survive fires as buried seeds, which tend to germinate prolifically after disturbance. These species seem to require an interval of at least eight years between fires, allowing newly germinated plants to reach reproductive maturity and establish a replacement seed bank. The natural patterns and processes involved in this kind of life cycle, including seed longevity, the environmental cues that stimulate germination, and even the time from germination to first flowering are still poorly understood.

The best studied interaction between animals and Persoonia species is that between the plants and their pollinators. All species that have been studied in detail have been found to be pollinated by a variety of native bees, but especially species of Leioproctus subgenus Cladocerapis (Colletidae), which rarely visit any plants but Persoonia. The behaviour of these bees on Persoonia flowers is quite predictable. Both males and females alight on the cross-shaped “platform” formed by the recurved anther tips, orient themselves to be facing one of the anther/tepals, then slide, face first, down between the anther and the style to reach the two glands at either side of the base of the tepal, and drink the nectar from them. Females gather pollen grains with their legs while drinking nectar. The insect then withdraws to the top of the flower, makes a 180° turn, then repeats the process on the other side of the flower. Another species group in Leioproctus, subgenus Filiglossa, also specialises in feeding on Persoonia flowers but these smaller bees seem to be nectar and pollen “thieves”, not effective pollinators. The introduced honeybee (Apis mellifera) is also a frequent visitor of Persoonia flowers at most sites but it is still unclear whether this species is an effective pollinator.
The fleshy fruits of Persoonia species are clearly adapted for animal dispersal but it is still unclear whether mammals such as possums and wallabies, or large flying birds such as currawongs are the most important dispersers. Parrots, also feed on Persoonia fruits, but the fruit (and seed) they eat are unripe, and hence their interaction with the plants is predatory rather than symbiotic.

Species list
The following is a list of species, subspecies and varieties of Persoonia accepted by the Australian Plant Census as at September 2020:

 Persoonia acerosa Sieber ex Schult. & Schult.f. - needle geebung (N.S.W.)
 Persoonia acicularis F.Muell. (W.A.)
 Persoonia acuminata L.A.S.Johnson & P.H.Weston (N.S.W.)
 Persoonia adenantha Domin (N.S.W., Qld.)
 Persoonia amaliae Domin (Qld.)
 Persoonia angustiflora Benth. (W.A.)
 Persoonia arborea  F.Muell. – tree geebung (Vic.)
 Persoonia asperula L.A.S.Johnson & P.H.Weston – mountain geebung (N.S.W., Vic.)
 Persoonia baeckeoides P.H.Weston (W.A.)
 Persoonia bargoensis L.A.S.Johnson & P.H.Weston – Bargo geebung (N.S.W.)
 Persoonia biglandulosa P.H.Weston (W.A.)
 Persoonia bowgada P.H.Weston (W.A.)
 Persoonia brachystylis  F.Muell. (W.A.)
 Persoonia brevifolia (Benth.) L.A.S.Johnson & P.H.Weston (N.S.W., Vic.)
 Persoonia brevirhachis P.H.Weston (W.A.)
 Persoonia chamaepeuce  Lhotsky ex Meisn. – yellow geebung, dwarf geebung (A.C.T., N.S.W., Vic)
 Persoonia chamaepitys A.Cunn. – prostrate geebung, mountain geebung (N.S.W.)
 Persoonia chapmaniana P.H.Weston (W.A.)
 Persoonia comata Meisn. (W.A.)
 Persoonia confertiflora Benth. – cluster-flower geebung (N.S.W., Vic.)
 Persoonia conjuncta L.A.S.Johnson & P.H.Weston (N.S.W.)
 Persoonia cordifolia P.H.Weston (W.A.)
 Persoonia coriacea Audas & P.Morris – leathery-leaf persoonia (W.A.)
 Persoonia cornifolia A.Cunn. ex R.Br. (N.S.W., Qld.)
 Persoonia curvifolia R.Br. (N.S.W.)
 Persoonia cuspidifera L.A.S.Johnson & P.H.Weston (N.S.W.)
 Persoonia cymbifolia P.H.Weston (W.A.)
 Persoonia daphnoides A.Cunn. ex R.Br. (N.S.W., Qld.)
 Persoonia dillwynioides Meisn. (W.A.)
 Persoonia elliptica R.Br. – snottygobble (W.A.)
 Persoonia falcata R.Br. – wild pear (N.T., Qld., W.A.)
 Persoonia fastigiata R.Br. (N.S.W.)
 Persoonia filiformis P.H.Weston (W.A.)
 Persoonia flexifolia R.Br. (W.A.)
 Persoonia glaucescens Sieber ex Spreng. – Mittagong geebung (N.S.W.)
 Persoonia graminea R.Br. (W.A.)
 Persoonia gunnii Hook.f. – mountain geebung (Tas.)
 Persoonia hakeiformis Meisn. (W.A.)
 Persoonia helix P.H.Weston (W.A.)
 Persoonia hexagona P.H.Weston (W.A.)
 Persoonia hindii P.H.Weston & L.A.S.Johnson (N.S.W.)
 Persoonia hirsuta Pers. – hairy persoonia, hairy geebung
 Persoonia hirsuta subsp. evoluta L.A.S.Johnson & P.H.Weston (N.S.W.)
 Persoonia hirsuta Pers. subsp. hirsuta (N.S.W.)
 Persoonia inconspicua P.H.Weston (W.A.)
 Persoonia iogyna P.H.Weston & L.A.S.Johnson (Qld.)
 Persoonia isophylla L.A.S.Johnson & P.H.Weston (N.S.W.)
 Persoonia juniperina Labill. – prickly geebung (N.S.W., S.A., Tas., Vic.)
 Persoonia juniperina var. brevifolia Meisn. (Tas.)
 Persoonia juniperina Labill. var. juniperina (Tas.)
 Persoonia juniperina var. mollis Orchard (N.S.W.)
 Persoonia juniperina var. ulicina Meisn. (N.S.W.)
 Persoonia kararae P.H.Weston (W.A.)
 Persoonia katerae P.H.Weston & L.A.S.Johnson (N.S.W.)
 Persoonia lanceolata Andrews – lance-leaf geebung (N.S.W.)
 Persoonia laurina Pers. – laurel-leaved geebung, laurel geebung (N.S.W.)
 Persoonia laurina subsp. intermedia L.A.S.Johnson & P.H.Weston (N.S.W.)
 Persoonia laurina Pers. subsp. laurina (N.S.W.)
 Persoonia laurina subsp. leiogyna L.A.S.Johnson & P.H.Weston (N.S.W.)
 Persoonia laxa L.A.S.Johnson & P.H.Weston (N.S.W.)
 Persoonia leucopogon S.Moore (W.A.)
 Persoonia levis (Cav.) Domin – broad-leaved geebung (N.S.W., Vic.)
 Persoonia linearis Andrews – narrow-leaved geebung (N.S.W., Vic.)
 Persoonia longifolia R.Br. – long-leaf persoonia (W.A.)
 Persoonia manotricha A.S.Markey & R.Butcher (W.A.)
 Persoonia marginata A.Cunn. ex R.Br. – Clandulla geebung (N.S.W.)
 Persoonia media R.Br. (N.S.W., Qld.)
 Persoonia micranthera P.H.Weston – small-flowered snottygobble (W.A.)
 Persoonia microphylla R.Br. (N.S.W.)
 Persoonia mollis R.Br. (N.S.W.)
 Persoonia mollis subsp. budawangensis S.Krauss & L.A.S.Johnson (N.S.W.)
 Persoonia mollis subsp. caleyi (R.Br.) S.Krauss & L.A.S.Johnson (N.S.W.)
 Persoonia mollis subsp. ledifolia (A.Cunn. ex Meisn.) S.Krauss & L.A.S.Johnson (N.S.W.)
 Persoonia mollis subsp. leptophylla S.Krauss & L.A.S.Johnson (N.S.W.)
 Persoonia mollis subsp. livens S.Krauss & L.A.S.Johnson (N.S.W.)
 Persoonia mollis subsp. maxima S.Krauss & L.A.S.Johnson (N.S.W.)
 Persoonia mollis R.Br. subsp. mollis (N.S.W.)
 Persoonia mollis  subsp. nectens S.Krauss & L.A.S.Johnson (N.S.W.)
 Persoonia mollis subsp. revoluta S.Krauss & L.A.S.Johnson (N.S.W.)
 Persoonia moscalii Orchard – creeping geebung (Tas.)
 Persoonia muelleri (P.Parm.) Orchard – Mueller’s geebung (Tas.)
 Persoonia muelleri var. angustifolia Meisn. (Tas.)
 Persoonia muelleri var. densifolia Labill. (Tas.)
 Persoonia muelleri (P.Parm.) Orchardvar. muelleri (Tas.)
 Persoonia myrtilloides Sieber ex Schult. & Schult.f. – myrtle geebung (N.S.W.)
 Persoonia myrtilloides subsp. cunninghamii (R.Br.) L.A.S.Johnson & P.H.Weston (N.S.W.)
 Persoonia myrtilloides Pers. subsp. myrtilloides (N.S.W.)
 Persoonia nutans R.Br. – nodding geebung (N.S.W.)
 Persoonia oblongata R.Br. (N.S.W.)
 Persoonia oleoides L.A.S.Johnson & P.H.Weston (N.S.W.)
 Persoonia oxycoccoides Sieber ex Spreng. (N.S.W.)
 Persoonia papillosa P.H.Weston (W.A.)
 Persoonia pauciflora P.H.Weston – North Rothbury persoonia (N.S.W.)
 Persoonia pentasticha P.H.Weston (W.A.)
 Persoonia pertinax P.H.Weston (W.A.)
 Persoonia pinifolia R.Br. – pine-leaved geebung (N.S.W.)
 Persoonia procumbens L.A.S.Johnson & P.H.Weston (N.S.W.)
 Persoonia prostrata R.Br. (Qld.)
 Persoonia pungens W.Fitzg. (W.A.)
 Persoonia quinquenervis Hook. (W.A.)
 Persoonia recedens Gand. (N.S.W.)
 Persoonia rigida R.Br. – rigid, hairy, or stiff geebung (A.C.T., N.S.W., Vic.)
 Persoonia rudis Meisn. (W.A.)
 Persoonia rufa L.A.S.Johnson & P.H.Weston (N.S.W.)
 Persoonia rufiflora Meisn. (W.A.)
 Persoonia saccata R.Br. (W.A.)
 Persoonia saundersiana Kippist (W.A..)
 Persoonia scabra R.Br. (W.A.)
 Persoonia sericea A.Cunn. ex R.Br. – silky geebung (N.S.W., Qld.)
 Persoonia silvatica L.A.S.Johnson (N.S.W., Vic.)
 Persoonia spathulata R.Br. (W.A.)
 Persoonia stradbrokensis Domin (Qld., N.S.W.)
 Persoonia stradbrokensis Domin  × Persoonia virgata R.Br. (N.S.W., Qld.)
 Persoonia striata R.Br. (W.A.)
 Persoonia stricta C.A.Gardner ex P.H.Weston (W.A.)
 Persoonia subtilis P.H.Weston & L.A.S.Johnson (Qld.)
 Persoonia subvelutina L.A.S.Johnson – velvety geebung (A.C.T., N.S.W., Vic.)
 Persoonia sulcata Meisn. (W.A.)
 Persoonia tenuifolia R.Br. (N.S.W., Qld.)
 Persoonia teretifolia R.Br. (W.A.)
 Persoonia terminalis L.A.S.Johnson & P.H.Weston – Torrington geebung (N.S.W., Qld.)
 Persoonia terminalis subsp. recurva L.A.S.Johnson & P.H.Weston (N.S.W., Qld.)
 Persoonia terminalis L.A.S.Johnson & P.H.Weston subsp. terminalis (N.S.W.)
 Persoonia trinervis Meisn. (W.A.)
 Persoonia tropica L.A.S.Johnson & P.H.Weston (Qld.)
 Persoonia virgata R.Br. (N.S.W., Qld.)
 Persoonia volcanica'' P.H.Weston & L.A.S.Johnson (N.S.W., Qld.)

References

Further reading

External links
 

 
Proteaceae genera
Taxa named by James Edward Smith
Endemic flora of Australia